KSU may refer to:

Universities
 Kansas State University in Manhattan, Kansas, US
 Kennesaw State University in Kennesaw, Georgia, US
 Kent State University in Kent, Ohio, US
 Kentucky State University in Frankfort, Kentucky, US
 Kahramanmaraş Sütçüimam University in Kahramanmaraş, Turkey
 Kazan State University in Kazan, Russia
 Kiev State University in Kiev, Ukraine
 King Saud University in Riyadh, Saudi Arabia
 Kun Shan University in Tainan, Taiwan

Other uses
 Kansas City Southern (company), as the NYSE ticker symbol  
 Key service unit or panel of the 1A2 Key Telephone System
 Kristiansund Airport, Kvernberget, Norway by IATA code 
 KSU (band), a 1970s punk rock band from Poland
 Kunsill Studenti Universitarji, a Maltese students' union
 Former callsign of Stanford University radio station KZSU